Internet commentator means a person who posts or publishes comments on the Internet.

Internet commentator may refer to:

 Shoutcaster, an eSports commentator who streams comment on the Internet
 A critic paid to produce comment for an Internet company
 50 Cent Party, Internet commentators hired by the government of China to post comments favorable towards government policies
 Russian web brigades, anonymous Internet political commentators and trolls linked to the Russian government

See also
 Pundit, a person who offers his or her opinion or commentary on a particular subject area
 Internet (disambiguation)
 Commentator (disambiguation)
 Comment (disambiguation)